In enzymology, a N-carbamoylsarcosine amidase is an enzyme that catalyzes the chemical reaction

N-carbamoylsarcosine + H2O  sarcosine + CO2 + NH3

Thus, the two substrates of this enzyme are N-carbamoylsarcosine and H2O, whereas its 3 products are sarcosine, CO2, and NH3.

This enzyme belongs to the family of hydrolases, those acting on carbon-nitrogen bonds other than peptide bonds, specifically in linear amides.  The systematic name of this enzyme class is N-carbamoylsarcosine amidohydrolase. This enzyme is also called carbamoylsarcosine amidase.  This enzyme participates in arginine and proline metabolism.

Structural studies

As of late 2007, only one structure has been solved for this class of enzymes, with the PDB accession code .

References

 

EC 3.5.1
Enzymes of known structure